Lama-ye Sofla (also Romanized as Lamā-ye Soflá) is a village in Sadat Mahmudi Rural District, Pataveh District, Dana County, Kohgiluyeh and Boyer-Ahmad Province, Iran. In 2006, its population was 311, spread across 61 families.

References 

Populated places in Dana County